The Hyundai Santa Cruz is a four-door compact pickup truck produced by Hyundai. Released in 2021 for the 2022 model year, the Santa Cruz is the first 4-door pickup truck sold by Hyundai in the North American market. The vehicle is based on the Tucson crossover SUV, and uses a unibody chassis design as opposed to the ladder frame used by most pickup trucks. Industry analysts expected the Santa Cruz to attract car or crossover buyers instead of people who have owned a larger, traditional pickup truck.

Overview

The vehicle was previewed by a concept pickup truck that was showcased at the 2015 North American International Auto Show with the same name.

The production model was revealed in April 2021 for the North American market. Marketed as a "Sport Adventure Vehicle", it is closely related to the fourth-generation Tucson, sharing the same project code, production site, and dashboard design. It also features a similar styling introduced on the fourth-generation Tucson, with its front end dominated by the grille with integrated daytime running lights.

The Santa Cruz uses a front-wheel-drive configuration as the base model, with an available upgrade to the HTRAC all-wheel-drive system. The HTRAC system allows for the rear wheels to receive up to 50 percent of the drive power via a lockable clutched center differential. It is equipped with strut suspension for the front wheels and a multi-link independent suspension in the rear. The rear suspension is equipped with self-leveling shock absorbers to keep the truck level even when there is weight on the bed or a trailer on the hitch.

The base engine is paired with an eight-speed automatic transmission, while the turbocharged engine gets an eight-speed dual-clutch automatic with paddle shifters.

Sales

References

External links 

 Official website (United States)
 Official website (Canada)

Santa Cruz
Pickup trucks
Sport utility trucks
Cars introduced in 2021
Front-wheel-drive vehicles
All-wheel-drive vehicles
Motor vehicles manufactured in the United States